Richard Frederick Hahn (July 24, 1916 – November 5, 1992) was a Major League Baseball catcher. In one career game, he had three career at-bats and did not get a hit.

Hahn was born in Canton, Ohio and died in Orlando, Florida. He was buried in Woodlawn Memorial Park in Gotha, Florida.

References

External links
Baseball Reference.com page

1916 births
1992 deaths
Washington Senators (1901–1960) players
Major League Baseball catchers
Baseball players from Ohio
Minor league baseball managers
Zanesville Greys players
New Orleans Pelicans (baseball) players
Spartanburg Spartans players
Canton Terriers players
Greenville Spinners players
Savannah Indians players
Charlotte Hornets (baseball) players
Buffalo Bisons (minor league) players
Syracuse Chiefs players
Enterprise Boll Weevils players